The 2010 Craven District Council election took place on 6 May 2010 to elect members of Craven District Council in North Yorkshire, England. One third of the council was up for election and the Conservative party gained overall control of the council from no overall control.

After the election, the composition of the council was
Conservative 18
Independent 8
Liberal Democrats 4

Background
Before the election the Conservatives were one seat short of holding a majority on the council with 15 seats. 9 seats were contested in the election with the Conservatives standing in all 9, compared to 7 Liberal Democrats, 4 Labour, 3 independents and 1 from the Youth Party. 2 sitting councillors, Manuel Camcho and Stephen Butcher stood down from Bentham and Gargrave and Malhamdale wards respectively, while Carl Lis stood as a Conservative after having been a councillor before the election as an independent, and before 1998 as a Liberal Democrat.

Election result
The results saw the Conservatives make 3 gains, including in Bentham and Settle and Ribblebanks wards. The third gain came in Ingleton and Clapham ward, where Carl Lis, who had held the seat as an independent before the election, was elected as a Conservative. The gains meant the Conservatives won 6 of the 9 seats contested, compared to 2 independents and 1 Liberal Democrats. Due to the general election being held at the same time overall turnout was over 75%, with the lowest being over 68% in Sutton-in-Craven.

Ward results

References

2010
2010 English local elections
May 2010 events in the United Kingdom
2010s in North Yorkshire